Exoncotis umbraticella is a moth of the family Acrolophidae. It is found in Panama and French Guiana.

References

Moths described in 1914
Acrolophidae